The 2012–13 FC Karpaty Lviv season was the 50th season in club history.

Review and events

Background
Karpaty Lviv began pre-season training on 6 June 2012. On 8 June 2012, the club announced that Andriy Tlumak and Taras Petrivskiy will leave FC Karpaty having received free-agent status.

On 7 December 2012 Polish defender Jakub Tosik left the club with a scandal, stating that he will never set a foot on Ukrainian land and calling club officials "bastards and thieves". Tosik appeared in 5 matches before he was suspended from the first team for unknown reasons.

On 27 May 2013 at FC Karpaty season review meeting it was decided to transfer list 19 players due to club's unsatisfactory results. Also measures of material influence were imposed on all members of the team.

Season
Karpaty opened their 20th top-tier national championship season with a 1–1 away draw against Volyn Lutsk in the so-called "Wild West Derby". This was the first ever draw between the two clubs in 17 official matches.

Restructuring
On 20 September 2012 Petro Dyminsky, an honorary president of Karpaty Lviv, officially passed management authority over the club to the club's supporters, thus making green'n'whites a first Ukrainian football club to do so. Petro Dyminsky stated that the strategic goal of the reorganization of FC Karpaty is a clear understanding that the club should not depend on private funds of founders, but to eventually obtain independent financial stability instead.

Competitions

Friendly matches

Pre-season

Mid-season

Winter break

Premier League

League table

Results summary

Matches

Ukrainian Cup

Squad information

Squad and statistics

Squad, appearances and goals

|-
|colspan="14"|Players away from the club on loan:

|-
|colspan="14"|Players featured for Karpaty but left before the end of the season:

|}

Goalscorers

Disciplinary record

Transfers

In

Out

Managerial changes

Sources

Karpaty Lviv
FC Karpaty Lviv seasons